Samuel Atta Mensah (born 10 DEC 1999) is a Ghanaian footballer playing for First Capital Plus Premier League side All Stars F.C. He was named among the 60 best young talents in world football by British daily The Guardian.

Career
He started off his career for Ghanaian Division One League team Dunkwa United. He topped the assist charts for the second division by setting up 17 goals in the season. He also scored 12 goals for the team. His performances earned him a move to First Capital Plus Premier League side All Stars F.C. He has been called the Ghanaian Luka Modrić by the Ghanaian press based on his passing game. He made his debut for the All Stars against Asante Kotoko S.C. He scored 4 goals and made 7 assists in 12 games to lead the All Stars to their first Ghana Premier League title in 2016. He was one of the African players who made it to the list of 60 best young talents in world football in 2016 by The Guardian.

References 

Living people
1999 births
Ghana Premier League players
Ghanaian footballers
Association football forwards
Legon Cities FC players